Jacson is both a surname and a given name. Notable people with the name include:

Antoine Jacson (1725–1804), Canadian soldier and woodcarver
Frances Margaretta Jacson (1754–1842), English writer
Maria Elizabetha Jacson (1755–1829), English writer
Frank Jacson, an alias of Ramón Mercader (1913–1978), Spanish communist and Soviet spy
Jacson (footballer, born 1989), Jacson da Paixão Neponuceno, Brazilian football forward
Jacson (footballer, born 1993), Jacson Glei Da Silva Clemente, Brazilian football forward

See also
Jackson (name)
Jaxson, given name